This is a list of television broadcasters which provide coverage of the EuroLeague, European professional basketball's top-tier level continental-wide competition.

Broadcasters

See also 

 List of EuroCup broadcasters

External links
TV Broadcasters at euroleague.net

References 

EuroLeague
EuroLeague
Basketball on television